Sti skini (Greek: Στη σκηνή) is the name of a live compilation album by popular Greek singer Marinella. It contains older live recordings by Marinella from 1971 - 1980 and it was released in October, 2006 in Greece by Universal Music Greece.

Track listing

Disc 1
 "Piretos" - (Akis Panou) - (Greek: Πυρετός)
 "Simvivazomaste" - (Giorgos Hadjinasios-Tasos Ikonomou) - (Greek: Συμβιβαζόμαστε)
 "Enan kero" - (Christos Leontis-Sotia Tsotou) - (Greek: Έναν καιρό)
 "23 Aprilides" - (Nakis Petridis-Sevi Tiliakou)  - (Greek: 23 Απρίληδες)
 "Ki' ego de milisa" - (Nakis Petridis-Sevi Tiliakou) - (Greek: Κι' εγώ δε μίλησα)
 "Nichtoperpatimata" - (Giorgos Hadjinasios-Tasos Ikonomou) - (Greek: Νυχτοπερπατήματα)
 "Akouste" - (Giorgos Katsaros-Pythagoras) - (Greek: Ακούστε)
 "Oute matia dakrismena" - (Giorgos Katsaros-Pythagoras) - (Greek: Ούτε μάτια δακρυσμένα)
 "Pot pourri" - (Greek: Ποτ πουρί)
 "Piso apo tis kalamies (Instrumental intro)" - (Giorgos Katsaros-Pythagoras) - (Greek: Πίσω από τις καλαμιές)
 "Pali tha klapso" - (Nakis Petridis-Sevi Tiliakou) - (Greek: Πάλι θα κλάψω)
 "Apopse se thelo" - (Mimis Plessas-Lefteris Papadopoulos) - (Greek: Απόψε σε θέλω)
 "Ama dite to feggari" - (Mimis Plessas-Lefteris Papadopoulos) - (Greek: Άμα δείτε το φεγγάρι)
 "Ti na ftei" - (Giorgos Zambetas-Dimitris Christodoulou) - (Greek: Τι να φταίει)
 "Apopse chano mia psychi" - (Giorgos Katsaros-Pythagoras) - (Greek: Απόψε χάνω μια ψυχή)
 "I antres den klene" - (Giorgos Katsaros-Pythagoras) - (Greek: Οι άντρες δεν κλαίνε)
 "Anixe petra" - (Mimis Plessas-Lefteris Papadopoulos) - (Greek: Άνοιξε πέτρα)
 "Drigi, drigi mana mou (Velvet mornings)" - (Stélios Vlavianós-Robert Constandinos-Pythagoras) - (Greek: Ντρίγκι, ντρίγκι, μάνα μου)
 "To mantalo" - (Giorgos Katsaros-Pythagoras) - (Greek: Το μάνταλο)
 "Ti na thimitho, ti na xechaso" - (Apostolos Kaldaras-Pythagoras) - (Greek: Τι να θυμηθώ, τι να ξεχάσω)
 "Pame gia ypno Katerina" - (Giorgos Katsaros-Pythagoras) - (Greek: Πάμε για ύπνο Κατερίνα)
 "An imoun plousios" (in duet with Marios Kostoglou) - (Doros Georgiadis-Sotia Tsotou) - (Greek: Αν ήμουν πλούσιος)
 "Derbenterissa" - (Vassilis Tsitsanis-Nikos Routsos) - (Greek: Ντερμπεντέρισσα)
 "De me stefanonese" - (Vassilis Tsitsanis) - (Greek: Δε με στεφανώνεσαι)
 "De simfonisame" - (Giorgos Zampetas-Alexandros Kagiantas) - (Greek: Δε συμφωνήσαμε)

Disc 2
 "Nekro mou oniro" - (Kostas Hatzis-Giannis Pavlou) - (Greek: Νεκρό μου όνειρο)
 "Olos o kosmos eis' esy" - (Kostas Hatzis-Sotia Tsotou) - (Greek: Όλος ο κόσμος είσ' εσύ)
 "S' agapo" - (Kostas Hatzis-Sotia Tsotou) - (Greek: Σ' αγαπώ)
 "S' aparnithika tris" - (Kostas Hatzis-Sotia Tsotou) - (Greek: Σ' απαρνήθηκα τρις)
 "Ki' ystera" - (Kostas Hatzis-Sotia Tsotou) - (Greek: Κι' ύστερα)
 "Tora pou stegnosan ta dakria mou" - (Kostas Hatzis-Ilias Lymperopoulos) - (Greek: Τώρα που στέγνωσαν τα δάκρυα μου)
 "Sinora i agapi den gnorizi" - (Kostas Hatzis-Sotia Tsotou) - (Greek: Σύνορα η αγάπη δεν γνωρίζει)
 "Otan to fos tis agapis tha svisei" - (Kostas Hatzis-Sotia Tsotou) - (Greek: Όταν το φως της αγάπης θα σβήσει)
 "Glyko tis niotis mou pouli" - (Kostas Hatzis-Sotia Tsotou) - (Greek: Γλυκό της νιότης μου πουλί)
 "Pare me mazi sou tsiggane" - (Kostas Hatzis-Sotia Tsotou) - (Greek: Πάρε με μαζί σου τσιγγάνε)
 "I agapi ola ta ypomenei" - (Kostas Hatzis-Sotia Tsotou) - (Greek: Η αγάπη όλα τα υπομένει)
 "Den thelo gramma" - (Kostas Hatzis-Xenofontas Fileris) - (Greek: Δεν θέλω γράμμα)
 "I palies kales meres" - (Kostas Hatzis-Giorgos Ikonomidis) - (Greek: Οι παλιές καλές μέρες)
 "Ton echasa" - (Kostas Hatzis-Sotia Tsotou) - (Greek: Τον έχασα)
 "Esy pou xeris" - (Kostas Hatzis-Xenofontas Fileris) - (Greek: Εσύ που ξέρεις)
 "Ah, pos me kitas" - (Kostas Hatzis-Xenofontas Fileris) - (Greek: Αχ, πώς με κοιτάς)
 "Mi zitas" - (Kostas Hatzis-Giorgos Ikonomidis) - (Greek: Μη ζητάς)
 "Mes sto iliovasilema" - (Kostas Hatzis-Sotia Tsotou) - (Greek: Μες στο ηλιοβασίλεμα)
 "Giati" - (Kostas Hatzis-Sotia Tsotou) - (Greek: Γιατί)
 "An tragoudousan ta tragoudia" - (Kostas Hatzis-Giorgos Ikonomidis) - (Greek: Αν τραγουδούσαν τα τραγούδια)
 "Pare ena kochili ap' to Aegeo" (in duet with Kostas Hatzis) - (Kostas Hatzis-Xenofontas Fileris) - (Greek: Πάρε ένα κοχύλι απ' το Αιγαίο)

Personnel 
 Marinella - vocals
 Marios Kostoglou - vocals and background vocals on tracks 3 - 8, 10 - 14 and 16 (on Disc 01)
 Kostas Hatzis - vocals, background vocals and arranger (on Disc 02)
 Yiannis Smyrneos - recording engineer
 Tasos Vrettos - photographer
 Achilleas Haritos - make-up artist

References

Greek-language albums
Marinella compilation albums
2006 live albums
Universal Music Greece live albums
Mercury Records live albums